FC Force is an American soccer club based in Bonita, California. The team plays in the National Premier Soccer League, the fourth tier of the American soccer pyramid. The team colors are navy blue, yellow and gray.

History
FC Force was admitted to the National Premier Soccer League on January 21, 2014. They will be playing in the Southwestern Conference of the NPSL West Region.

FC Force won the West Region's Southwest Conference in their first year. They lost 5–2 to the Sacramento Gold in the NPSL Regional semifinals.

Year-by-year

Staff
Alfredo Marcq Sr. - Owner
Alfredo Marcq Jr. - President
Jorge Zavala - General Manager
Diego Lucas Terry - Head Coach
Sergio Villalva - Assistant Coach
Lorenzo Vazquez - Goalkeeper Coach

Stadiums
Southwest High School, El Centro, California (2014)
Holtville High School, Holtville, California (2014)
Calexico High School, Calexico, California (2014)
Central Union High School, El Centro, California (2015–present)

References

External links
 NPSL site

2014 establishments in California
Association football clubs established in 2014
Soccer clubs in the Greater San Diego Area
Imperial County, California
National Premier Soccer League teams